Zou Jingzhi (邹静之, 1952) is a Chinese playwright. He has written the librettos for two Chinese-language western-style operas by woman composer Lei Lei: Xi Shi (opera) based on the story of Xi Shi, and The Chinese Orphan (2011) based on the story The Orphan of Zhao. The premiere of both operas was at Beijing's NCPA.

Filmography
 Riding Alone for Thousands of Miles (2005) (screenplay)
 The 601st Phone Call (2006) (writer)
 My Kingdom (2011) (screenplay)
 The Grandmaster (2013) (screenplay)
 Coming Home (2014) (screenplay)
 Xuanzang (2015) (screenplay)

References

External links
 

Chinese dramatists and playwrights
1952 births
Living people
20th-century Chinese poets
Chinese male short story writers
Screenwriters from Jiangxi
People from Nanchang
Poets from Jiangxi
21st-century Chinese writers
20th-century Chinese male writers
People's Republic of China short story writers
Short story writers from Jiangxi